"Papa Don't Preach" is a song recorded by American singer-songwriter Madonna for her third studio album True Blue (1986). The song was written by Brian Elliot with additional lyrics by Madonna, who produced it alongside Stephen Bray. Furthermore, it was included in the compilation albums The Immaculate Collection (1990) and Celebration (2009). Musically, "Papa Don't Preach" combines pop and classical styling, with lyrics that talk about teenage pregnancy, and the choices that come with it. The teen gossip Elliot would hear outside his recording studio inspired him to write it.

Released as the album's second single in mid-1986, it saw commercial success, becoming Madonna's fourth number-one single on the Billboard Hot 100; "Papa Don't Preach" also performed well internationally, reaching the top position in the United Kingdom and Australia. It was lauded by contemporary critics, who noted an artistic growth in Madonna's work, and frequently cited it as a highlight in the album and a milestone in her career. The music video, directed by James Foley, shows the singer in her first "head-to-toe" image makeover, with a leaner, more toned body, and cropped platinum blonde hair. Its main storyline had Madonna trying to tell her father, played by actor Danny Aiello, about her pregnancy. The scenes are juxtaposed with shots of her dancing and singing in a small, darkened studio, and spending a romantic evening with her boyfriend, played by Alex McArthur.

Shortly after its release, the song caused heated discussions about its lyrical content. Women's organizations and others in the family planning field criticized Madonna for encouraging teenage pregnancy, while groups opposed to abortion saw the song as having a positive anti-abortion message. Madonna has performed "Papa Don't Preach" in five of her concert tours, the last being 2019―2020's Madame X Tour. The single's performance at the Who's That Girl World Tour (1987) caused Madonna's first conflict with the Vatican, as she dedicated it to Pope John Paul II, who urged Italian fans to boycott her concerts. In 2002, British singer Kelly Osbourne recorded a cover of the song, which was met by lukewarm critical reception, but achieved commercial success.

Background and release 
During the autumn of 1985, Madonna started writing and recording songs for her third studio album, True Blue; she brought back Steve Bray and hired a new producer, Patrick Leonard. The album's first track, "Papa Don't Preach", was written by Brian Elliot, who described it as "a love song, maybe framed a little bit differently [...] about a young girl who found herself at a crossroads in life and didn’t know where to turn". Elliot, who had recorded an album of his own for Warner Bros., was producing sessions for an artist named Cristina Dent. When he played her tracks for Warner's Michael Ostin, the same A&R executive who discovered "Like a Virgin", he asked if he could play "Papa Don't Preach" for Madonna; Elliot had been working with Dent for six months and was reluctant to let the song go to another artist, but he eventually gave in, finding the idea of Madonna recording his song "hard to resist".

The lyrics of the song are based on teen gossip Elliot would hear outside his recording studio, which has a large front window that doubled as a mirror where schoolgirls from the Los Angeles' North Hollywood High School would regularly stop to fix their hair and chat. Madonna only contributed with some additional lyrics, making "Papa Don't Preach" the only song on the album that she did not have a strong hand in writing. In the United States, "Papa Don't Preach" was released as True Blues second single on June 11, 1986; in Europe, it was released five days later. Afterwards, it was included on Madonna's compilation albums The Immaculate Collection (1990), and Celebration (2009). In a 2009 interview with Rolling Stone, the singer was asked by Austin Scaggs why she felt attracted to the song's theme and lyrics; she replied,
[The song] just fit right in with my own personal zeitgeist of standing up to male authorities, whether it's the pope, or the Catholic Church or my father and his conservative, patriarchal ways. ... For 'Papa Don't Preach' there were so many opinions – that's why I thought it was so great. Is she for 'schma-smortion', as they say in Knocked Up? Is she against abortion?

Composition 

"Papa Don't Preach" is a dance-pop song with instrumentation from acoustic, electric, and rhythm guitars, keyboards, and string arrangements; it is set in common time, and moves at a moderate tempo of 116 beats per minute. Written in the key of F minor, the combination of key and tempo produces a disjuncture between pop and classical rhythms, underlined by the instrumentation during the introduction. It begins with a distinctly Vivaldian style, as the fast tempo and classical-style chord progression anticipates the lyrics to follow. The opening chords and the melody emphasize the tonic of the leading notes: Fm–E–D–Cm–D–E–Fm–D–E–Fm, resembling a Baroque work. This is followed by the sound of dance music, produced by a powerful beat from the instruments. Madonna's vocal range spans from F3 to C5, and was described as being "more mature" and "centered" than that of her previous works.

The lyrics talk about a girl who tells her father that she's pregnant and refuses to have an abortion or give up the baby for adoption, despite her friends' advice. The track is constructed in a verse-chorus form, with a bridge before the third and final chorus; at the beginning, she addresses her father directly, asking him to talk to her as an adult, "You should know by now that I'm not a baby". The transition to the chorus employs a more dramatic voice with a higher range, ending nearly in cries as she sings the word "Please". Leading to the chorus, Madonna switches to a pleading voice, singing the song's main hook in a high tone. During the bridge, the song features a Spanish-inspired rhythm, one of the earliest examples of the influence that Hispanic music had on Madonna's musical style.

Critical reception 
The song has been acclaimed since its release. According to Rolling Stones Davitt Sigerson on his review of True Blue, "only the magnificent 'Papa Don’t Preach' has the high-profile hook to match 'Like a Virgin', 'Dress You Up' and 'Material Girl'", and compared it to Michael Jackson's "Billie Jean" (1983). From the Chicago Tribune, Daniel Brogan referred to it as "stunning". Stephen Thomas Erlewine, for Allmusic, called it a "masterstroke" and applauded Madonna for "using the music to hook in critics just as she's baiting a mass audience". Santiago Fouz-Hernández, co-author of Madonna's Drowned Worlds (2004), pointed out it was a "significant milestone in [Madonna]'s artistic career". Adam Sexton, author of Desperately Seeking Madonna: In Search of the Meaning of the World's Most Famous Woman (2008), named it True Blues "boldest" track; although its melody is just as "insistently chugging" as the singer's previous singles "Into the Groove" and "Dress You Up" (1985), the mood is "tense and claustrophobic". For Entertainment Weeklys David Browne, "a 30-ish urban sophisticate singing in the voice of a pregnant teen [...] ought to sound ridiculous. With the help of collaborators like Stephen Bray and Patrick Leonard, though [...] [it] turns into a perfectly conceived pop record". From the New York Times, Stephen Holden pointed out that "Madonna sings it in a passionate, bratty sob that makes the plea immediate and believable".

Caroline Sullivan from The Guardian, opined that it was the artist's "first socially controversial single, and one of her best tunes to boot [...] it wasn't her first attempt at a teenage persona (see also 'Dress You Up'), but it was the most endearing". Sal Cinquemani from Slant, thought it was "undeniably more mature" than the singer's previous works up at that point, further adding that, with songs like "Papa Don’t Preach", "[Madonna] made the transition from pop tart to consummate artist, joining the ranks of the decade’s icons like Michael Jackson and Prince". Writing for PopMatters, Peter Piatkowski said it was an "idiosyncratic tune", that shared the "maturity and ambition" of previous single "Live to Tell". For the Los Angeles Times, Robert Hilburn expressed that the "most obvious growth is in the control and character in Madonna's singing", and considered the lyrics to be "tailor-made for video". The Arizona Republics Ed Masley noted a "huge artistic growth" and "more soul than was expected at the time" in the singer's vocals. A lukewarm review came from The Daily Iowans Jeff Hamilton: "[Madonna] had a good year at the stores, but can anyone take her music seriously? [...] In terms of scrutable ideology ['Papa Don't Preach'] doesn't represent a change from 'Like A Virgin'".

Retrospective reviews have also been positive: for Parade, Samuel R. Murrian praised it for treating a "complicated subject with humanity and the gravity it merits", and having an "ace[s] pop hook driving it"; he named it Madonna's 25th best song. It was ranked in the 21st place of Slants ranking of Madonna singles: Paul Schrodt opined it "may well be the only song about choosing not to have an abortion that also feels rebellious, even dangerous". Schrodt further singled out the "cinematic string arrangement", which gives the track a "sweeping backdrop", concluding that "Madonna has rarely sounded more impassioned". Entertainment Weeklys Chuck Arnold also considered it her 21st best, and the staff of Billboard her 28th. Jude Rogers, from The Guardian, named it her fifth greatest song, praising its "glorious string arrangement [that] adds cinematic authority", and Madonna's vocals. For Yahoo!'s Nicole Hogsett, "['Papa Don't Preach'] proved that Madonna could tackle a serious topic but still keep her signature sound". From website Albumism, Justin Chadwick said that "Papa Don't Preach" was "arguably the most unforgettable of True Blues many memorable moments".

According to Gay Star News Joe Morgan, "Papa Don't Preach" is the singer's tenth best single, while the HuffPost Matthew Jacobs ranked it her 14th, highlighting its "sweeping string arrangement" as "one of pop music's most engaging openings".  Nayer Missim from PinkNews named it the third best song of Madonna's discography; "a rare example of Madonna-as-storyteller [...] Unfairly dismissed (or claimed) as a pro-life anthem, its lyrics are much more personal, open and interesting than that", Missim wrote. For Stereogums Tom Breihan, "Papa Don't Preach" is an example of "how Madonna, a technically limited singer, could always capture the feeling of a song". At the 29th Grammy Awards, "Papa Don't Preach" was nominated for Best Female Pop Vocal Performance but lost to Barbra Streisand's The Broadway Album.

Commercial reception 
On June 18, 1986, "Papa Don't Preach" was added to 174 of 226 pop reporting radio stations, which caused it to debut on the Billboard Hot 100 at number 42. One month later, the song reached the sixth place of the chart, becoming Madonna's ninth consecutive top 10 single; she became the fourth female artist in the rock era to earn this amount of consecutive top 10 singles, behind only Brenda Lee, Aretha Franklin and Donna Summer. On August 16, "Papa Don't Preach" reached the Hot 100's first position and spent two weeks there. It was Madonna's fourth US number one. This also gave her her eight consecutive top 5 hit, the most for any artist in the 1980s; Madonna became one of only three acts to amass a total of eight top 5 hits – consecutive or not – in the decade, the others being Air Supply and Lionel Richie. It placed at position 29 for the Billboard year-end chart for 1986. In October 1998, it was certified gold by the Recording Industry Association of America (RIAA) for shipment of 500,000 copies. "Papa Don't Preach" entered the Dance Club Songs chart at number 38 the week of July 19, eventually peaking at number four on August 30. The single also peaked at 16 on the Adult Contemporary chart. In Canada the song debuted at number 53 of the RPM singles chart on July 5, eventually reaching and remaining on the top for two weeks on August 9. "Papa Don't Preach" came in at position 13 of RPMs 1986 year-end chart.

In the United Kingdom, the single debuted at number 13 on the Singles Chart on June 28, before climbing to number one two weeks later; it remained three consecutive weeks at the top, and 15 weeks on the chart in general. "Papa Don't Preach" was certified gold by the British Phonographic Industry (BPI) in August 1986 for shipment of 500,000 copies. According to Music Week magazine, over 629,386 copies of the single have been sold in the United Kingdom as of 2008. The song was commercially successful across Europe as well: it topped the charts in Belgium, Ireland, and Norway, and peaked within the top 5 in Austria, France, Germany, the Netherlands, Spain and Switzerland. In Italy, the song spent 12 consecutive weeks at the top of the Musica e dischi charts. "Papa Don't Preach" reached the first position of the Eurochart Hot 100, where it remained for 11 weeks. The song also reached the top of the charts in Australia, and the top 5 in South Africa and New Zealand.

Music video

Background and synopsis 

The music video for "Papa Don't Preach" was directed by James Foley, who had previously worked with Madonna on "Live to Tell"; production was done by David Naylor and Sharon Oreck, while Michael Ballhaus was in charge of the photography. It was shot on location over three days in May 1986 in Staten Island, New York and Manhattan; according to Foley, Madonna wanted something "a bit more grounded and 'drama'", having just done the "very glamorous and stylized" videos for "Material Girl" and "Like a Virgin", thus he suggested filming in Staten Island. Actor Danny Aiello was chosen by the singer to play her father on the clip; Aiello claimed he had never heard of the singer before and only agreed to do the video by petition of his daughter. Actor Alex McArthur was signed on to play the singer's boyfriend and father of her child; she had spotted McArthur in a small role in the 1985 film Desert Hearts and thought he was a natural to play her mechanic boyfriend; "I was out in the garage working on my Harley [...] I answered the phone and a voice said, 'Hi, this is Madonna. I would like you to be in my next video'", the actor recalled. For the music video, Madonna sported a complete image makeover: she changed the heavy jewelry and make-up, and adopted a gamine look similar to the one donned by Shirley MacLaine and Audrey Hepburn during the 1950s. The video interspersed shots of the singer as a tomboy – dressed in jeans, black leather jacket, and a slogan T-shirt with the caption "Italians do it better" – with those of her in a "figure-revealing" outfit, consisting of a 1960s-style black bustier top and capri pants. Her body was also leaner and muscular. Of the alternating looks and shots of the singer, Foley recalled:
We took the script literally from the lyrics of the song, and I remember having a moment's hesitation about doing that because most videos are not literal interpretations. But I just felt like it was something that tied into her desire to dip into the working-class world. I did have the idea that there should be a segment of the video where she was Madonna — not the character in the story — and that's where it cuts to the black and white stuff of her dancing around for the chorus.
The clip starts with shots of the New York skyline, the Staten Island Ferry, and character close-ups. Madonna, who plays an Italian American young woman, is seen walking along a lane; she thinks about her father (Aiello) and how much he loves her, and then goes to meet her boyfriend (MacArthur). The images are juxtaposed with shots of Madonna dancing and singing in a small, darkened studio. In the next scene, she walks away from her friends (Debi Mazar and Bianca Hunter), after they warn her about her boyfriend. Next, her and her boyfriend spend a romantic evening together on a barge where they reflect upon their lives after watching an elderly couple. Madonna then finds out that she is pregnant and decides to keep the baby. After much hesitation, she tells her father, who's shocked and leaves the room to think about the situation, before eventually accepting the pregnancy. Afterward, father and daughter hug each other. "Papa Don't Preach" can be found on Madonna's video compilations The Immaculate Collection (1990), and Celebration: The Video Collection (2009).

Reception and analysis 

The video received positive reviews from critics. According to the staff of Rolling Stone, it was the moment Madonna began "treating the music video concept as more of a short film than promotional clip"; they also applauded her "rather unglamorous" look for fitting "nicely" with the song's subject matter. For Hal Marcovitz, author of The History of Music Videos (2012), it marked a "sharp departure" from what the public was used to see in the singer's videos up until that point; "in most of her videos [she] promoted her sex appeal, usually strutting through her tightly choreographed dances in stiletto heels and barely there costumes". Retrospective reviews have named it one of Madonna's best music videos: Idolators Mike Neid placed it in the fourth position of his ranking, highlighting the singer's onscreen relationship with her father and applauding her for "showing off a more serious side of her artistry". For The Odyssey, Rocco Papa also named it Madonna's fourth best and singled out the views of New York City. It came in the sixteenth and tenth positions of the rankings created by The Backlot and Rolling Stone, respectively; for the former, Louis Virtel said that "the urgency in her performance makes this video, as well as the climactic hug in the last second of the story". Sal Cinquemani, on a Billboard article enlisting the singer's nine most controversial music videos, deemed it her "first bona-fide video controversy". At the 1987 MTV Video Music Awards, "Papa Don't Preach" won Best Female Video, and was nominated for Best Cinematography and Best Overall Performance.

Journalist Ellen Goodman referred to the video as a "commercial for teen-age pregnancy", and criticized it for "glamorizing" said subject; "[her] boyfriend is a hunky dreamboat with a conscience and moral compass, while her father is loving, supportive and even-tempered". Goodman argued that few pregnant teenagers would find a similar support from their boyfriends and families. "This happily-ever-after image has about as much to do with the reality of adolescent motherhood as Madonna's (shapely) figure has to do with pregnancy", the author concluded, and asked the singer to "call off the propaganda". Fellow singer Cyndi Lauper also weighed in and added that "if you're a teen mother who wants to keep her baby [...] you're not going to look like Madonna [...] it ain't gonna be that easy. Fathers don't always come around to give you their blessing. The guy who knocked you up doesn't always hang around". Georges-Claude Guilbert, author of Madonna as Postmodern Myth, said it was hard for him to believe that "[Madonna] did not know that she was going to cause a huge controversy [...] With such a song and video, she was throwing in America's face the image of a country ravaged by the abortion debate, which is far from being resolved". He further viewed the singer as being "pro-choice"; "[she] deems that a woman (whatever her age) must choose whether to recur or not to abortion without paying attention to outside pressure. No representative of the feminist lobby or of the patriarchy will dictate her conduct". In the book The Fiction of America: Performance and the Cultural Imaginary in Literature and Film (2013), Susanne Hamscha argued that the clip oscillates between liberal and conservative ideology, private and public, feminism and patriarchy, and "female independence and the need for paternal approval"; Amy Robinson stated that the topic of abortion is "explicitly" addressed in terms of the "private/public dive", and noted how Madonna's character "glorifies parental consent".

Controversy 

As the song's popularity increased in the United States, so did the criticism and support it received from groups concerned with pregnancy and abortion. Feminist lawyer Gloria Allred, the spokeswoman of the National Organization for Women (NOW), angrily called for Madonna to make a public statement or another record supporting the opposite point of view. Alfred Moran, the executive director of Planned Parenthood of New York City, also criticized the song, fearing that it would undermine efforts to promote birth control among teenagers and would encourage teenage pregnancy. Recalling how in 1985 his agency's clinics were filled with girls dressed in a style similar to Madonna's, Moran felt that the song's message was "getting pregnant is cool and having the baby is the right thing and a good thing and don't listen to your parents, the school, anybody who tells you otherwise—don't preach to me, Papa. The reality is that what Madonna is suggesting to teenagers is a path to permanent poverty". Similarly, social worker Kathie Peters added that "too many kids are getting pregnant. They don't know what they're getting into. I don't like the [song's] message". The singer herself discussed the song with music critic Stephen Holden:
"Papa Don't Preach" is a message song that everyone is going to take the wrong way. Immediately they're going to say I am advising every young girl to go out and get pregnant. When I first heard the song, I thought it was silly. But then I thought, wait a minute, this song is really about a girl who is making a decision in her life. She has a very close relationship with her father and wants to maintain that closeness. To me it's a celebration of life. It says, 'I love you, father, and I love this man and this child that is growing inside me'. Of course, who knows how it will end? But at least it starts off positive.
In contrast, groups opposed to abortion saw "Papa Don't Preach" as a positive, anti-abortion song. Susan Carpenter-McMillan, the president of the California chapter of Feminists for Life (FFL) in the US, said that "abortion is readily available on every street corner for young women. Now what Madonna is telling them is, hey, there's an alternative". Tipper Gore, a founder of the Parents Music Resource Center (PMRC), who had previously denounced Madonna for perceived sexual content in her single "Dress You Up" and had led a campaign against explicit content in music, applauded the singer for speaking candidly about a serious subject; "['Papa Don't Preach'] speaks to a serious subject with a sense of urgency and sensitivity in both the lyrics and Madonna's rendition. It also speaks to the fact that there's got to be more support and more communication in families about this problem, and anything that fosters that I applaud".

Composer Brian Elliot also weighed in: "I just wanted to make this girl in the song a sympathetic character. As a father myself, I'd want to be accessible to my children's problems". Danny Aiello, having appeared in the video as the titular "Papa", recorded "Papa Wants the Best for You" later that year, an answer song written by Artie Schroeck from the father's point of view; he even asked Madonna to participate in a music video for the song, but she turned the offer down. Madonna  did not comment on the song's use as a pro-life statement; her publicist Liz Rosenberg said that "[she] is singing a song, not taking a stand [...] her philosophy is people can think what they want to think".

Live performances 

"Papa Don't Preach" has been included on five of Madonna's concert tours: Who's That Girl (1987), Blond Ambition (1990), Re-Invention (2004), MDNA (2012) and Madame X (2019―2020). On the first one, she performed the song wearing a leather jacket over a 1950s blue dress; the screen in the background showed portraits of Pope John Paul II, then-president of the United States Ronald Reagan, the White House, and the phrase "Safe sex". In Italy, the Vatican publicly denounced the singer, with John Paul II going as far as to urge fans to boycott the concerts in the country. Writing for the New York Times, Jon Pareles pointed out that, at certain point in the performance, Madonna tilted her chin up to resemble the cover photograph for True Blue. Two different performances can be found on the videos Who's That Girl: Live in Japan, filmed in Tokyo on June, and Ciao Italia: Live from Italy, filmed in Turin on September.

On the Blond Ambition World Tour, "Papa Don't Preach" was given a Catholic theme: the stage was set up to resemble a cathedral with votive candles, while the singer wore black vestments and the dancers black kaftans; they waved their hands over their heads as Madonna sang and danced. Carlton Wilborn, one of the dancers, played a priest the singer interacted with. While reviewing the Houston concert, the staff of the  Orlando Sentinel highlighted the number's "joyous gospel and heavy gothic organ scorings". Two different performances can be found in Blond Ambition Japan Tour 90, taped in Yokohama, and in Blond Ambition World Tour Live, taped in Nice.

For the song's performance on the Re-Invention World Tour, Madonna donned a plaid kilt and a black T-shirt that read "Kabbalists Do It Better" ― a nod to the one worn on the music video. The number, which included a Ring a Ring o' Roses circle dance, was praised for its "playfulness and innocence" by Newsdays Glenn Gamboa. An abbreviated "Papa Don't Preach" was included on The MDNA Tour; the performance found the singer rolling on the floor before being "manhandled and bound" by dancers dressed as tribal warriors. Timothy Finn, for The Kansas City Star, noted it was the number that caused "the first big eruption" from the crowd. The performances of the song at the November 19–20 shows in Miami were recorded and released in Madonna's fourth live album, MDNA World Tour (2013). "Papa Don't Preach" was one of the songs performed during Madonna's visit to The Late Late Show with James Corden in December 2016. The singer again did a shortened rendition of the single on her Madame X Tour, where she changed the lyric "I'm keeping my baby" to "I'm not keeping my baby". Selena Fragassi, from the Chicago Sun-Times, applauded Madonna for turning the song into a "platform for pro-choice beliefs".

Covers

Kelly Osbourne 

A pop-metal cover of "Papa Don't Preach" was recorded by Kelly Osbourne in 2002; in April of that year, MTV reported that Osbourne had recorded a demo of the song per her mother Sharon's suggestion. Produced by her brother Jack, it featured Incubus members Mike Einziger and Jose Pasillas on guitar and drums, respectively. Executives for The Osbournes were impressed with the demo and requested a studio version, set to be included on an upcoming soundtrack to the series. Osbourne then re-recorded the song without involving her brother or the two members of Incubus; this version, described as being "more polished", was added to The Osbourne Family Album soundtrack. Explaining the cover, Osbourne said, “I love Madonna. Who doesn't?". Afterwards, the song was added as a hidden bonus track to Osbourne's debut album Shut Up.

To promote the release, Osbourne shot a music video for the song in Los Angeles, which was directed by Marcos Siega; she then sang it live at the MTV Movie Awards, where her father introduced her to the audience.  Critical reviews were generally mixed: Billboards Chuck Arnold considered it an "aggressive post-punk anthem" that's "certainly good for three minutes of steering-wheel banging on the way to the market". NMEs Peter Robinson, on the other hand, said it made "precisely zero sense", and criticized the presence of Incubus for making "the whole sorry mess barely distinguishable". Entertainment Weeklys Rob Brunner was also negative on his review, dismissing the cover as "unnecessary". Despite lukewarm reviews from critics, the single was commercially successful: it peaked at number three in the United Kingdom and Australia, where it was certified platinum by the Australian Recording Industry Association (ARIA), for having sold over 70,000 units. Furthermore, Osbourne's version reached the top 40 in Austria, Germany, Italy, and New Zealand, the top 20 in Sweden, and the top 10 in Ireland and Finland.

Other versions 
In 1986, "Weird Al" Yankovic included the song in one of his polka medleys, "Polka Party!", taken from his album of the same name. In 2002, French–Dutch group Mad'House did a Eurodance take on the song, that was included on their album Absolutely Mad. One Year later, Picturehouse sang it for the first Even Better Than the Real Thing covers album. Renditions of the song on tribute albums include Brook Barros on The Music of Madonna (2005) and a jazz version on Bo. Da's  Plays Madonna in Jazz (2007). "Papa Don't Preach" was sampled at the beginning of Mario Winans' 2004 single "Never Really Was". Finally, in 2009, Dianna Agron sang the track on the eleventh episode of American television series Glee, "Hairography".

Track listing and formats 

US 7" single
"Papa Don't Preach" – 4:27
"Pretender" – 4:28

UK 7" single
"Papa Don't Preach" – 4:27
"Ain't No Big Deal" – 4:12

Japan 7" single
"Papa Don't Preach" (Radio Edit) – 3:47
"Think of Me" – 4:54

International CD Video single
"Papa Don't Preach" – 4:27
"Papa Don't Preach" (Extended Remix) – 5:43
"Pretender" – 4:28
"Papa Don't Preach" (Video) – 5:00

US 12" Maxi-Single
"Papa Don't Preach" (Extended Remix) – 5:43
"Pretender" – 4:28

Germany / U.K. 12" limited edition
A1."Papa Don't Preach" (Extended Version) – 5:45
B1."Ain't No Big Deal" – 4:12
B2."Papa Don't Preach" – 4:27

'Germany / UK CD Maxi-Single (1995)
"Papa Don't Preach" (Extended Version) – 5:45
"Ain't No Big Deal" – 4:12
"Papa Don't Preach" – 4:27

 Credits and personnel 
Brian Elliot – Music and lyrics
Madonna – additional lyrics, producer, lead vocals
Stephen Bray – producer, synth bass, percussion, drums, keyboard
Reggie Lucas – producer of "Ain't No Big Deal"
David Williams – rhythm guitar
Bruce Gaitsch – electric guitar
John Putnam – acoustic guitar, electric guitar
Fred Zarr – additional keyboard
Johnathan Moffett – percussion
Billy Meyers – string arrangement
Siedah Garrett – background vocals
Edie Lehmann – background vocals
 Herb Ritts – photography
 Jeri McManus – design

Credits adapted from the True Blue'' album and the 12" single liner notes.

Charts

Weekly charts

Year-end charts

Decade-end charts

All-time charts

Certifications and sales

See also 

 List of number-one singles in Australia during the 1980s
 List of Billboard Hot 100 number ones of 1986
 List of number-one singles of 1986 (Canada)
 List of Cash Box Top 100 number-one singles of 1986
 List of European number-one hits of 1986
 List of number-one hits of 1986 (Italy)

References

Bibliography

External links 
 

1986 songs
1986 singles
2002 debut singles
Billboard Hot 100 number-one singles
Cashbox number-one singles
European Hot 100 Singles number-one singles
Irish Singles Chart number-one singles
Kelly Osbourne songs
Madonna songs
MTV Video Music Award for Best Female Video
Number-one singles in Australia
Number-one singles in Belgium
Number-one singles in Italy
Number-one singles in Norway
Oricon International Singles Chart number-one singles
RPM Top Singles number-one singles
UK Singles Chart number-one singles
Songs about abortion
Songs with feminist themes
Songs written by Madonna
Song recordings produced by Madonna
Song recordings produced by Stephen Bray
Songs about fathers
Sire Records singles
Warner Records singles
Music video controversies
Obscenity controversies in music